Peter John Crane (born 15 March 1950) is a former English cricketer.  Crane was a right-handed batsman who bowled right-arm off break.  He was born in South Shields, County Durham.

Crane made his debut for Durham against Shropshire in the 1973 Minor Counties Championship.  He played Minor counties cricket for Durham from 1973 to 1983, making 64 Minor Counties Championship appearances.  He made his List A debut against Yorkshire in the Gillette Cup.  He wasn't required to bat in this match, which Durham famously 5 wickets against first-class opposition.  He made a further List A appearance against Nottinghamshire in the 1980 Gillette Cup.  He was dismissed for 17 runs in this match by Peter Hacker, with Nottinghamshire winning by 4 wickets.

References

External links
Peter Crane at ESPNcricinfo
Peter Crane at CricketArchive

1950 births
Living people
Cricketers from South Shields
English cricketers
Durham cricketers